This is a list of nationwide public opinion polls that have been conducted relating to the general election for the 2020 United States presidential election. The persons named in the polls were declared candidates or received media speculation about their possible candidacy. If multiple versions of polls are provided, the version among likely voters (LV) is prioritized, then registered voters (RV), then adults (A).

Donald Trump vs. former Democratic candidates 
The following candidates are ordered by the date they withdrew or suspended their campaign.

 Bernie Sanders

 Tulsi Gabbard

 Elizabeth Warren

 Michael Bloomberg

 Amy Klobuchar

 Pete Buttigieg

 Tom Steyer

 Michael Bennet

 Andrew Yang

 John Delaney

 Cory Booker

 Marianne Williamson

 Julián Castro

 Kamala Harris

 Steve Bullock

 Wayne Messam

 Beto O'Rourke

 Tim Ryan

 Bill de Blasio

 Kirsten Gillibrand

 Seth Moulton

 Jay Inslee

 John Hickenlooper

 Mike Gravel

 Eric Swalwell

Hypothetical polling
The scenarios contained in the collapsed table below include candidates who have explicitly declined to run, candidates who have not been the subject of speculation regarding a potential candidacy, and generic Democratic and independent opponents. Hypotheticals are also included involving withdrawn candidates.

with Donald Trump and Michael Avenatti

with Donald Trump, Michael Avenatti, and Michael Bloomberg

with Donald Trump, Joe Biden, and Michael Bloomberg

with Donald Trump, Joe Biden, and Howard Schultz

with Donald Trump and Richard Blumenthal

with Donald Trump and Sherrod Brown

with Donald Trump and Stephanie Clifford/Stormy Daniels

with Donald Trump and Hillary Clinton

with Donald Trump and Mark Cuban

with Donald Trump and Andrew Cuomo

with Donald Trump and Al Franken

with Donald Trump, Kamala Harris, and Howard Schultz

with Donald Trump and Eric Holder

with Donald Trump and Dwayne Johnson

with Donald Trump and Joe Kennedy III

with Donald Trump and Barack Obama

with Donald Trump and Michelle Obama

with Donald Trump and Alexandria Ocasio-Cortez

with Donald Trump, Beto O'Rourke, and Howard Schultz

with Donald Trump and Nancy Pelosi

with Donald Trump and Megan Rapinoe

with Donald Trump, Bernie Sanders, and Howard Schultz

with Donald Trump and Chuck Schumer

with Donald Trump, Elizabeth Warren, and Michael Bloomberg

with Donald Trump, Elizabeth Warren, and Howard Schultz

with Donald Trump and Frederica Wilson

with Donald Trump and Oprah Winfrey

with Donald Trump and Mark Zuckerberg

with Donald Trump, Mark Zuckerberg, and Joe Scarborough

with Mike Pence and Joe Biden

with Mike Pence and Kamala Harris

with Mike Pence and Pete Buttigieg

with Mike Pence and Beto O'Rourke

with Mike Pence and Bernie Sanders

with Mike Pence and Elizabeth Warren

with Mike Pence and Michael Bloomberg

with Donald Trump, generic Democrat, and Howard Schultz

with Mike Pence and generic Democrat

with Mitt Romney and generic Democrat

with Nikki Haley and Joe Biden

with Nikki Haley and Elizabeth Warren

with Nikki Haley and Bernie Sanders

with Nikki Haley and Kamala Harris

with Nikki Haley and Pete Buttigieg

with Nikki Haley and Beto O'Rourke

with generic Republican and generic Democrat

with Donald Trump and generic Democrat

with generic Democrat and generic Independent

with generic Democrat and generic third party

with Donald Trump and generic Centrist Democrat

with Donald Trump and generic Progressive Democrat

with Donald Trump and generic Opponent

See also
Statewide opinion polling for the 2020 United States presidential election
Nationwide opinion polling for the 2020 Democratic Party presidential primaries
Statewide opinion polling for the 2020 Democratic Party presidential primaries
Opinion polling for the 2020 Republican Party presidential primaries
2020 Democratic National Convention
2020 Republican National Convention
Opinion polling on the Donald Trump administration

Notes

Partisan clients

External links
General election poll tracker from FiveThirtyEight